Number One is the debut studio album by Nigerian rapper M Trill. It was released on 17 October 2008 by Grafton  Records with distribution by Afrobest Productions. Supported by the hit single "Bounce" which gained airplay on several major radio  stations, the album contains guest appearances from 2Shotz, Ruggedman, Timaya, Uchie, Korkormikor, Frank D Nero, ShoBoi and vocals from Ghanaian singer Fire. All songs on Number One were written solely by Teria Yarhere. Although the  record involved a lot more rap music, it also encompassed a distinct highlife/hip hop sound.

Background
M Trill began recording music after high school and signed his first recording contract with Xcel Music. In 2005, he released his  first single "Bounce" which received significant radio airplay in Nigeria and abroad. By the time he graduated from the University of Port Harcourt, M Trill had begun to reach a mainstream audience with many big labels offering him record deals. He later signed to Grafton Records after leaving Xcel Music. M Trill has explained the reason for switching record labels:

...I have always wanted to be one of the world's best, and since my deal with Grafton included a UK release and I have  always looked at the wider market. Also, I knew Grafton Records as always being true to their words. When they say something, they  do it.

Release
In early October 2008, M Trill announced Number One had been completed. He said that the album won't only appeal to rap fans  but will influence the general public's perception of rap music: "Rap does not necessarily have to be noisy or hardcore, it's a kind of  music that people should be able to relate with, that is why I tried as much as possible to pick my words. This is because I want  listeners to understand the message I am trying to pass across." Furthermore, Tonye Ibiama, the label's head revealed in an  interview that they delayed the release of the album to handle pending projects. On 17 October 2008, Grafton Records threw a one-day star-studded "bash" in Rivers State which saw in its attendance rappers Ruggedman and 2Shotz as well as a host of other  music celebrities. The event, held in Port Harcourt at the Hotel Presidential, served as the album's launch party.

Composition
Number One is generally rap music although a few songs on the album are a mixture of hip hop and highlife music. The first track, which is titled "Intro" is a compelling showcase of M Trill's simplistic yet slick rhyming and hook-laden,  avant-garde sound. Following the track is "Langwa Remix". The song featured 2Shotz and is similar in tone to its predecessor. M Trill continued impressively on the single "Bounce". Crossing into a new hiplife territory, "Beautiful", the fourth song recorded  alongside Ghanaian artist Fire introduced a different feel to the album. "Come Clean" was another rap throwdown in which M Trill would state his intents.

Number One lacked the naiveté expected from a newcomer rather it exhibited more of personality, maturity and growth. In  addition, the album included cinematic skits intended to prep the listener for whats to come. For "My Party",  Timaya was enlisted to add his vocals. The song incorporated elements drawn from highlife and hip hop. "First listen", a track  that features Uchie and Ruggedman also gave the album a more distinct vibe of its own.

Reception

Accolades

Channel O Music Video Awards

!Ref
|-
|rowspan="1"|2008
|"Bounce"
|Best West African Video
|
|

African Music Awards

!Ref
|-
|rowspan="1"|2009
|"Number one"
|Best new act 
|
|

Track listing

Release history

References

2008 albums
M Trill albums
2008 in Nigerian music